Thambi is a 2019 Indian Tamil-language action thriller film directed by Jeethu Joseph. Co-written by Rensil D'Silva, Sameer Arora, Jeethu Joseph and K. Manikandan, it was jointly produced by Viacom 18 Motion Pictures and Parallel Mind Productions. Starring Karthi, Jyothika and Sathyaraj, the film follows a young man who is believed to be a local politician's long-lost son but has his identity questioned by the politician's daughter. The film also stars Nikhila Vimal, Anson Paul, Bala, Sowcar Janaki, and Seetha in other important roles. The music for the film was composed by Govind Vasantha.

Thambi was released on 20 December 2019, receiving praise for the performances action sequences and writing and the film became a commercial success.

Plot
A fight erupts between teenagers Saravanan and Manimaran, where Saravanan is hit on the head by Manimaran and faints. Manimaran is forced to escape, leaving the fainted Saravanan on top of a lorry. 

15 years later: Gnanamoorthy is a politician in Mettupalayam, Coimbatore District, who lives with his wife Padma, daughter Parvathy, and wheelchair-bound mother. Parvathy spends her days in sorrow, hoping that her aggressive younger brother Saravanan, who had left home 15 years ago, will return. Her family believes that the miracle of him coming back may happen. One day, Moorthy receives a call from Jeevanand, who tells him that his long-lost son is found. In reality, "Saravanan" is Vicky, a trickster and tourist guide in Goa. Moorthy brings Vicky to his house, where Padma is overjoyed at seeing her son. However, Parvathy keeps shunning Vicky. Saravanan's childhood friend and lover, Sanjana, is also elated to reunite with "him". 

Jeeva and Vicky had secretly planned for Vicky to pose as Saravanan for a while before stealing money from the house and escaping, after which they would share the bounty. Saravanan's friend Karan, who is a cop, doubts whether Vicky is actually Saravanan, which grows stronger when he asks Vicky about their childhood and he flounders. However, Parvathy stops Karan from trying to disprove Vicky/Saravanan since the joy in her family has come back upon his arrival anyway. 

Meanwhile, it is revealed that Moorthy had in fact arranged for Jeeva to make Vicky pose as Saravanan. Karan suspects Vicky is involved in the murder since he shows up at Jeeva's house trying remove evidence that he is a fraud. However, Karan doesn't find any proof tying Moorthy or Vicky to Jeeva's death and arrests Manimaaran. Moorthy had already entered the house once more and removed all the evidence.

While Vicky is driving, he is hit by a truck and narrowly escapes death. Another attack in the house confirms his suspicions that someone is trying to kill Saravanan and sets out to find out what really happened to him. After tracing Saravanan's steps that night, he finds the truck that hit him, and on interrogating the driver, learns that the perpetrator is Moorthy's right-hand man Sudhakar, who was angry that Saravanan had come back as he would lose the position of MLA to him.

Finally, with a clue from Sanjana, Vicky deduces that Saravanan had returned home the night of his disappearance - he was a drug addict who had fought with his family and was the reason for his grandmother's paralysis. He believes that out of anger over Saravanan hurting his grandmother, Moorthy had killed his son accidentally and used the sympathy to earn votes. On confronting him, Moorthy offers Vicky money to keep the matter quiet, but Vicky tells Padma, who is already aware of it. Suddenly, Parvathy holds Vicky at gunpoint and reveals what happened that night.

15 years back: After Saravanan had fought with Padma and Parvathy and pushed his grandmother down the stairs, they took his grandmother to the hospital. Meanwhile, Saravanan managed to escape after his fight with Manimaran and returned home on his bike. Moorthy and Parvathy came back to the house and found Saravanan getting high. In a fit of rage, Moorthy beat his son, but when Saravanan hit him back in a drug-fueled rage, Moorthy broke down. Parvathy tried to console her father and threw away her brother's drugs. Saravanan began choking her and in desperation, Parvathy grabbed a nearby showpiece and accidentally slit his throat. In order to save his family's reputation, Moorthy fabricated a story where Saravanan had run away. Saravanan's body was interred in the forest area where the resort is now proposed to be built.

Present: Shocked at the revelation, Vicky decides to leave the house. At the train station, Parvathy admits that she had come to accept Vicky as her brother. The film ends with Vicky/Saravanan and Parvathy driving back home.

Cast

 Karthi as Saravanan (Fake) / Vicky
Jyothika as Parvathy
Ammu Abhirami as Young Parvathy
Sathyaraj as Gnanamoorthy
Seetha as Padma 
Nikhila Vimal as Sanjana
Yukta as Young Sanjana
Anson Paul as Karan 
Sowcar Janaki as Parvathy and Saravanan's Grandmother 
Bala as MLA Manimaaran
Ilavarasu as T. G. Jeevanand
Hareesh Peradi as Sudhakar 
Navneeth Madhav as Saravanan
Ramesh Thilak as Vicky's friend
Ashwanth Ashokkumar as Kutta
Semmalar Annam as Gunavathi, Kutta's mother
Mathew Varghese as CEO
Hello Kandasamy as Villager
Aroul Djody as Neurologist 
Jeethu Joseph as a guest appearance

Production
In February 2019, it was announced that Karthi and Jyothika would be sharing screen space together for the first time under the direction of Jeethu Joseph. Later, Govind Vasantha and R. D. Rajasekhar were confirmed to be the film's music director and cinematographer respectively. 

Principal photography began in mid April 2019. The film was completed in a single schedule. It was shot extensively in Palakkad, Goa, Coimbatore, and Ooty. The film's title revealed to be Thambi on 15 November 2019.

Music 

The soundtrack is composed by Govind Vasantha, and the audio rights of the film were acquired by Lahari Music. The audio launch of this film was held at Sathyam Cinemas, Chennai on 30 November 2019, in the presence of Jyothika, Karthi and Suriya, who attended the event as the chief guest, along with the film's cast and crew. The album features four tracks with an instrumental theme music, and the lyrics for the songs were written by Vivek and Karthik Netha.

The Times of India, reviewed it as "the album is a treat to ears, with each song having a refreshing musical touch."

Release 
Thambi was released on 20 December 2019. The theatrical rights of the film were acquired by Sakthi Film Factory. while Ravuri V. Srinivas, acquired the Andhra Pradesh and Telangana distribution rights under their Harshitha Movies banner. The film was also dubbed and released in Hindi as My Brother Vicky on YouTube by Goldmines Telefilms on 29 November 2020.

Reception

Critical reception
Sify rated 3.5 out of 5 stars stating, "Thambi is an engaging watch for the solid performances of the lead actors and very unlike most thrillers you’ve seen recently." The Times of India rated 3 out of 5 stars stating "The movie manages to entertain with ample suspense and family moments, which keep us guessing till the end – there’s an interesting twist towards the end of the first half and another appealing one in the climax, too. But the slow screenplay should have had more moments to make it a proper edge-of-the-seat film. Though the entire plot revolves around sister-brother bonding, we get only a few emotional moments between Karthi and Jyotika. A tighter screenplay with more emotional connect would have done wonders."

Firstpost rated 3 out of 5 stars stating, "An impressive performance by Karthi powers Jeetu Joseph's engaging thriller." The Indian Express rated 2.5 out of 5 stars stating "This Karthi and Jyotika starrer could have been so much more but settles for much less." India Today rated 3 out of 5 stars stating "Thambi’s runtime seems to be a little longer and a taut screenplay would have made wonders to the overall film. Yet, the film has brilliant twists that will have you engrossed in it."

Behindwoods rated 2.5 out of 5 stars stating, "The twists, an engaging second half and powerful lead performances make Thambi a watchable suspense thriller." Baradwaj Rangan of Film Companion South wrote "It’s easy — actually, not so easy, but at least, it’s the lesser of the evils — to ignore the badly shot songs, the badly staged action scenes, the badly executed tone shifts, or even the all-round badness of the performances. The director encourages everyone to mug madly — every reaction shot from Karthi is like a wink to the audience. But what else can the poor man do, when given impossible scenes like the ones that have him talking to his conscience in various mirrors?"

Box office
In 10 days, the film grossed around 19 crore in Tamil Nadu.

References

External links

2019 films
2010s Tamil-language films
2019 action thriller films
Indian action thriller films
Films directed by Jeethu Joseph
Films scored by Govind Vasantha